Prescott High School is a public high school located in the city of Prescott, Wisconsin. The enrollment is approximately 400.

Athletics
Prescott High School's athletic teams are known as the Prescott Cardinals. The Cardinals have been members of the Middle Border Conference since 2002; previously they were members of the Dunn-St. Croix Conference. They have won state titles in baseball (1994 and 2012), and in dance (2000-2013 and 2015). Prescott's main rival throughout the years has been and continues to be Ellsworth High School.

Athletic teams
 Boys' cross country
 Girls' cross country
 Girls' volleyball
 Football
 Girls' golf
 Girls' basketball
 Boys' basketball
 Wrestling
 Boys' track and field
 Girls' track and field
 Boys' golf
 Baseball
 Softball
 Dance

State titles
 Dance (Pom) 2000–2013, 2015
 Dance (Jazz) 2011, 2013–15, 2017, 2019
 Baseball 1994, 2012
 Basketball (Boys) 2018

Notable alumni
Boyd Huppert, news reporter for KARE 11
Nick Schommer, professional football player for the Tennessee Titans
Heidi Swank, Nevada legislator

References

External links
Prescott High School website

Public high schools in Wisconsin
Schools in Pierce County, Wisconsin